A flag is a colored cloth with a specified meaning.

Flag(s) or The Flag(s) may also refer to:

Places
 Flag, Arkansas, an unincorporated community
 Flag, Missouri, a ghost town
 Flag River, a river in northern Wisconsin
 Flag (crater), a small crater in the Descartes Highlands of the Moon

Arts, entertainment, and media

Fictional entities
Captain Flag, American superhero
 Foundation for Law And Government (FLAG), a fictional law-enforcement foundation in the TV series Knight Rider and sequels

Film and television
 Flag (TV series), a 2006 series by Kazuo Terada
 The Flag: A Story Inspired by the Tradition of Betsy Ross, a 1927 silent short film

Music
 Flag (note), a part of a note value in music notation
 Flag, a band formed by former members of Black Flag
 Flag (James Taylor album), 1979
 Flag (Yello album), 1988
 Flags (Brooke Fraser album), 2010
 Flags (Moraz and Bruford album), 1985
 The Flag (album), by Rick James, 1986
 ”Flags”, a song by Coldplay from Everyday Life, 2019

Paintings
 Flag (painting), a 1954/1955 painting by American artist Jasper Johns
 The Flag (O'Keeffe painting), a 1918 painting by Georgia O'Keeffe

Other media
 Flag (lighting), in film and photography, a device used to block light
 The Flag (novel), a 1965 novel by Robert Shaw
 Karogs, The Flag in Latvian, a literary magazine (1940–2010)

Biology and medicine

Plants
Flag is the common name of several genera or species of flowering plants:
 Acorus calamus or sweet flag, found in many countries
 Flag iris or just "flag", various species in North America
 Libertia pulchella, or pretty grass-flag, a species native to New Guinea, New Zealand and Australia
 Patersonia or native flag, an Australian plant genus resembling the genus Iris

Other uses in biology and medicine 
 FLAG (chemotherapy), a chemotherapy regimen
 FLAG-tag, a unique epitope added to proteins in biochemistry
 Flagging (botany), a growth pattern that reduces or eliminates growth on one side of a tree or other plant

Computing 
 Flag (computing), a true/false, on/off or open/closed indicator (Boolean variable)
 Command line flag, a modifier for a command line interface command
 FLAGS register (computing), a CPU register on x86 systems
 Fiber-Optic Link Around the Globe (FLAG), an undersea fiber optic cable
 To alert admins on a message board that a post needs to be moderated

Industry 
 F.L.A.G. (Fabbrica Ligure Automobili Genova), an Italian automobile manufacturer  1906
 FLAGS (Far North Liquids and Associated Gas System), a natural gas pipeline in the North Sea
 Flag and pennant patterns, in technical analysis

Mathematics 
 Flag (geometry), part of a polygon, polyhedron or higher polytope
 Flag (linear algebra), an increasing sequence of subspaces of a vector space

Physical science and technology
 Flagstone or flag, a large flat stone used for paving, fencing, or roofing

Politics and government 
 The Free Legal Assistance Group or FLAG, the largest firm of Filipino human rights lawyers
 Flag state, the state under whose laws a merchant ship is registered or licensed

Sports and games 
 Flag, a baton used in the sporting event Beach Flags
 Flag, a type of bet offered by UK bookmakers
 Flag, a casino token used at the Bellagio in Las Vegas, Nevada
 Penalty flag or flag, a yellow cloth used by game officials in some field sports to indicate an infraction
 The prize for being the premier of the Australian Football League.

Other uses 
 Church of Scientology Flag Service Organization, commonly referred to in Scientology as "Flag," in Clearwater, Florida, U.S.

See also
 
 Flagg (disambiguation)
 Flagger (disambiguation)
 Flagging (disambiguation)
 Red flag (disambiguation)
 White flag (disambiguation)